This is the discography of American R&B/soul musician Leela James.

Studio albums

Singles

References

Discographies of American artists